Omar Toft (June 30, 1886 in Bourbon, Missouri – November 12, 1921 in Phoenix, Arizona) was an American racing driver. Toft succumbed to injuries sustained in a racing accident at the Arizona State Fairgrounds. He was a son of Nis Toft and Angeline Lewis.

Indianapolis 500 results

References

1886 births
1921 deaths
People from Boone County, Missouri
Racing drivers who died while racing
Indianapolis 500 drivers
Sports deaths in Arizona
Racing drivers from Missouri